714 Naval Air Squadron was a squadron of the British Royal Navy's Fleet Air Arm. It was first formed as 714 (Catapult) Flight on 15 July 1936, by renumbering 406 (Catapult) Flight, and operated Fairey IIIF floatplanes from cruisers in the East Indies (probably principally 4th Cruiser Squadron). The Fairey IIFs were quickly replaced by Hawker Osprey floatplanes and Supermarine Walrus flying boats, and in 1937 these were supplemented by Fairey Seafox floatplanes. By July 1938 it had consolidated on the Walrus as equipment, and in early 1939 it was upgraded to full squadron status. It was disbanded on 21 January 1940, when all the Fleet Air Arm's catapult units were merged to form 700 Naval Air Squadron.

The squadron was reformed on 1 August 1944 at RNAS Fearn near Tain, Scotland, as an operational training squadron equipped with the Fairey Barracuda. It moved to RNAS Rattray (HMS Merganser) near Crimond, Aberdeenshire in October 1944.  Its commanding officers included Lieutenant Commander J R Godley, who transferred from the disbanded 835 Naval Air Squadron, taking over in May 1945. The squadron disbanded on 29 October 1945.

See also
List of Fleet Air Arm aircraft squadrons

References

700 series Fleet Air Arm squadrons